Alexander Sergeyevich Uspenski (born 25 April 1987) is a Russian former competitive figure skater. He is the 2006 Finlandia Trophy silver medalist and 2004 ISU Junior Grand Prix Final bronze medalist.

Personal life 
Alexander Uspenski was born on 25 April 1987 in Moscow. He is the elder brother of Vladimir Uspenski, who also competed in figure skating.

Career 
Alexander Uspenski began competing on the ISU Junior Grand Prix (JGP) circuit in 2001. Over the course of five seasons, he would win seven medals – three gold, two silver, and two bronze – and qualify three times to the ISU Junior Grand Prix Final. He won the bronze medal at the 2004 JGP Final.

Uspenski withdrew from the 2005 World Junior Championships due to the flu. He was sent again the following year and finished 8th.

Uspenski made his senior international circuit debut in the 2006–07 season. After taking the silver medal at the 2006 Finlandia Trophy, he debuted on the senior Grand Prix series, finishing 5th and 6th at his two events. Uspenski missed the Russian national championships as a result of whooping cough. He changed coaches from Natalia Dubinskaia to Marina Kudriavtseva in January 2007.

Uspenski competed on the GP series for two more seasons before retiring in 2010.

Programs

Competitive highlights
GP: Grand Prix; JGP: Junior Grand Prix

References

External links

 Official site
 

Russian male single skaters
1987 births
Figure skaters from Moscow
Living people